The NBL Canada Coach of the Year Award, is an annual National Basketball League of Canada award given since the 2011–12 season. Since its inception, the award has been given to 5 different coaches. Micheal Ray Richardson of the London Lightning is the only coach to get the award more than once. In the 2012–13 season Richardson shared the award with Joe Salerno. The most recent recipient is Hugo López of the Halifax Hurricanes. After receiving the award in 2015, Josep Clarós was handed a lifetime ban from the NBL Canada, for forfeiting the seventh game of the 2015 Finals.

Winners

References

National Basketball League of Canada awards
Basketball coaching awards